The Environmental Change Institute at the University of Oxford in England was founded in 1991 "to organize and promote interdisciplinary research on the nature, causes and impact of environmental change and to contribute to the development of management strategies for coping with future environmental change".

In 2013/14 it had a research income of £4.7million, 50 active projects, 350 partners and 60 researchers working across 40 countries.

The ECI's research is interdisciplinary in both outlook and approach. The Institute has worked on aspects of climate, energy and ecosystems and is developing expertise with food and water.

ECI is involved in several long-term research projects, including the UK Climate Impacts Programme (UKCIP) which develops new tools to link climate science with business and government for innovations that can adaptat to the impacts of climate change and Climateprediction.net, the world's largest citizen science climate project with 350,000 individuals running climate simulations in order to better understand regional climate patterns. Staff of the institute have led EU consortium programmes including Impressions, studying the impacts and risks of extreme climate change; and co-ordinated GEM, a global ecological monitoring programme across remote forest locations in South America, Africa and Asia.

The ECI also runs an MSc in Environmental Change and Management (ECM).

The Institute was led by Professor Jim Hall from 2011 until September 2018. He was replaced by Friederike Otto who is currently acting Director.

Research 
The ECI's research is organised around five main themes in climate, ecosystems, energy, food and water.

There are expert teams in:
 Biodiversity and climate adaptation
 Climate impacts and adaptation
 Ecosystem dynamics and ecosystem services
 Energy demand management
 Extreme climate event attribution
 Food security
 Sustainable infrastructure systems
 Tropical forests and carbon dynamics
 Water security

References

1991 establishments in England
Organizations established in 1987
Research institutes of the University of Oxford
Research institutes in Oxford
Environmental organisations based in England
Environmental research institutes